The Kuwait Emir Cup is the premier cup competition involving teams from the Kuwaiti Premier League and the Kuwaiti Division One league.

The 2013–14 edition is the 51st to be held.

The winners qualify for the 2015 AFC Cup.

External links
soccerway.com

Kuwait Emir Cup seasons
2013–14 in Kuwaiti football
2013–14 domestic association football cups